Yitav (an abbreviation of Yad Yitzhak Tabenkin) is an Israeli settlement and moshav shitufi in the southern Jordan Valley of the West Bank. Located just north of Jericho and west of the Palestinian village of al-Auja, it falls under the jurisdiction of Bik'at HaYarden Regional Council.

The international community considers Israeli settlements in the West Bank illegal under international law, but the Israeli government disputes this.

History
According to ARIJ, Israel confiscated 499 dunams of land from the Palestinian village of Al-Auja in order to construct Yitav.

Niran was established as a Nahal settlement in 1970, Yitav was recognised by the state in 1977, and began operating as a kibbutz. It was named a memorial to Yitzhak Tabenkin, one of the leaders of the Israeli kibbutz movement. It subsequently reorganized into a moshav shitufi (though remaining within the Kibbutz Movement), whose members today are immigrants from the former Soviet Union (34 families).

Nature
Subtropical agriculture is the main economic activity in Yitav (dates, bananas, vegetables), although some members have outside jobs in the surrounding area or in Jerusalem.

Yitav Nature Reserve located 4 km west of Yitav covers the canyon of Nahal Yitav (Wadi al-Auja) with its springs.

References

External links
Yitav on Bik'at HaYarden Regional Council site .

Moshavim
Former kibbutzim
Israeli settlements in the West Bank
Populated places established in 1970
1970 establishments in the Israeli Military Governorate